Magenta Line (Line 8) is a metro rail line of the Delhi Metro, a rapid transit system in Delhi, India and the first driverless metro in India. Unlike the Airport Metro Express, this line directly serves Terminal 1 of the Indira Gandhi International Airport.

Janakpuri West metro station on the line contains India's tallest escalator with vertical height of 15.6 metres. The Magenta Line has interchanges with the Yellow Line at Hauz Khas, Blue Line at Janakpuri West & Botanical Garden and the Violet Line at Kalkaji Mandir of the Delhi Metro network.

Shankar Vihar metro station on the line is unique as it is the only station on the network where free movement of civilians is restricted by the military, as it falls in the Delhi Cantonment area and according to DMRC official "located right in the heart of the defence zone, it thus will cater primarily to defence personnel". The Hauz Khas metro station on this line is the deepest Metro station at a depth of 29 metres.

For the first time in India, the construction work of two parallel tunnels was completed together at Dabri Mor - Janakpuri South station. The Janakpuri West, Dabri Mor - Janakpuri South & Dashrath Puri stations have been executed by an HCC-Samsung joint venture.

History
The line was initially targeted for completion in December 2016, however, this date was extended due to difficult tunnelling conditions. The trials of the line began in August 2017. The line got inaugurated in two stages where the first section from Botanical Garden to Kalkaji Mandir was opened for public by Prime Minister Narendra Modi on 25 December 2017 and the second stage got inaugurated by Delhi Chief Minister Arvind Kejriwal on 28 May 2018. The remaining section of the line became functional and opened for public use from 29 May 2018 at 06:00 hrs IST.

Extension history
A stretch of 8.679 km having 9 stations on Botanical Garden – Kalkaji Mandir section was opened to public on 25 December 2017. The remaining portion of line opened on 28 May 2018.

Phase 4
In addition to Kalindi Kunj depot, the Magenta Line will have a new depot at Mangolpuri. Under this phase, the line will be further extended from Janakpuri West to Ramakrishna Ashram Marg, providing interchanges with Green, Red, Yellow, Pink and Blue lines, and improving connectivity in the northern parts of Delhi. The extension is expected to be completed by September 2024.

Stations

Train info

See also 

 Delhi
 List of Delhi Metro stations
 Delhi Metro
 Delhi Monorail
 Delhi Suburban Railway
 Transport in Delhi
 Urban rail transit in India
 List of metro systems

References

External links

 
 Delhi Metro Annual Reports
 UrbanRail.Net – descriptions of all metro systems in the world, each with a schematic map showing all stations.

Delhi Metro lines
Railway lines opened in 2017